Joël Venceslas Kouassi (born 25 October 1981) is a retired Ivorian-born Burkinabé footballer who played as a defender.

Career
Kouassi played club football for FC Libourne, captaining the club through its first season in Ligue 2.

References

External links
 
 Profile at footballdatabase.eu

Living people
1981 births
Footballers from Abidjan
Association football defenders
Burkinabé footballers
Burkinabé expatriate footballers
Expatriate footballers in France
Burkina Faso international footballers
FC Libourne players
FC Nantes players
Ligue 2 players
Ivorian emigrants to Burkina Faso
21st-century Burkinabé people